An aircraft propeller, also called an airscrew, converts rotary motion from an engine or other power source into a swirling slipstream which pushes the propeller forwards or backwards. It comprises a rotating power-driven hub, to which are attached several radial airfoil-section blades such that the whole assembly rotates about a longitudinal axis. The blade pitch may be fixed, manually variable to a few set positions, or of the automatically variable "constant-speed" type.

The propeller attaches to the power source's driveshaft either directly or through reduction gearing. Propellers can be made from wood, metal or composite materials.

Supersonic tip-speeds are used in some aircraft like the Tupolev Tu-95, which can reach .

History

The earliest references for vertical flight came from China. Since around 400 BC, Chinese children have played with bamboo flying toys. This bamboo-copter is spun by rolling a stick attached to a rotor between one's hands. The spinning creates lift, and the toy flies when released. The 4th-century AD Daoist book Baopuzi by Ge Hong (抱朴子 "Master who Embraces Simplicity") reportedly describes some of the ideas inherent to rotary wing aircraft.

Designs similar to the Chinese helicopter toy appeared in Renaissance paintings and other works.

It was not until the early 1480s, when Leonardo da Vinci created a design for a machine that could be described as an "aerial screw", that any recorded advancement was made towards vertical flight. His notes suggested that he built small flying models, but there were no indications for any provision to stop the rotor from making the craft rotate. As scientific knowledge increased and became more accepted, man continued to pursue the idea of vertical flight. Many of these later models and machines would more closely resemble the ancient bamboo flying top with spinning wings, rather than Leonardo's screw.

In July 1754, Russian Mikhail Lomonosov had developed a small coaxial modeled after the Chinese top but powered by a wound-up spring device  and demonstrated it to the Russian Academy of Sciences. It was powered by a spring, and was suggested as a method to lift meteorological instruments. In 1783, Christian de Launoy, and his mechanic, Bienvenu, used a coaxial version of the Chinese top in a model consisting of contrarotating turkey flight feathers  as rotor blades, and in 1784, demonstrated it to the French Academy of Sciences. A dirigible airship was described by Jean Baptiste Marie Meusnier presented in 1783. The drawings depict a  streamlined envelope with internal ballonets that could be used for regulating lift. The airship was designed to be driven by three propellers. In 1784 Jean-Pierre Blanchard fitted a hand-powered propeller to a balloon, the first recorded means of propulsion carried aloft. Sir George Cayley, influenced by a childhood fascination with the Chinese flying top, developed a model of feathers, similar to that of Launoy and Bienvenu, but powered by rubber bands. By the end of the century, he had progressed to using sheets of tin for rotor blades and springs for power. His writings on his experiments and models would become influential on future aviation pioneers.

William Bland sent designs for his "Atmotic Airship" to the Great Exhibition held in London in 1851, where a model was displayed. This was an elongated balloon with a steam engine driving twin propellers suspended underneath. Alphonse Pénaud developed coaxial rotor model helicopter toys in 1870, also powered by rubber bands. In 1872 Dupuy de Lome launched a large navigable balloon, which was driven by a large propeller turned by eight men. In 1894, his machine was tested with overhead rails to prevent it from rising. The test showed that it had enough lift to take off. One of Pénaud's toys, given as a gift by their father, inspired the Wright brothers to pursue the dream of flight. The twisted airfoil (aerofoil) shape of an aircraft propeller was pioneered by the Wright brothers. While some earlier engineers had attempted to model air propellers on marine propellers, the Wright Brothers realized that a propeller is essentially the same as a wing, and were able to use data from their earlier wind tunnel experiments on wings, introducing a twist along the length of the blades. This was necessary to maintain a more uniform angle of attack of the blade along its length. Their original propeller blades had an efficiency of about 82%,<ref>Ash, Robert L., Colin P. Britcher and Kenneth W. Hyde. "Wrights: How two brothers from Dayton added a new twist to airplane propulsion." Mechanical Engineering: 100 years of Flight, 3 July 2007.</ref> compared to 90% for a modern (2010) small general aviation propeller, the 3-blade McCauley used on a Beechcraft Bonanza aircraft. Roper quotes 90% for a propeller for a human-powered aircraft.

Mahogany was the wood preferred for propellers through World War I, but wartime shortages encouraged use of walnut, oak, cherry and ash. Alberto Santos Dumont was another early pioneer, having designed propellers before the Wright Brothers for his airships. He applied the knowledge he gained from experiences with airships to make a propeller with a steel shaft and aluminium blades for his 14 bis biplane in 1906. Some of his designs used a bent aluminium sheet for blades, thus creating an airfoil shape. They were heavily undercambered, and this plus the absence of lengthwise twist made them less efficient than the Wright propellers. Even so, this was perhaps the first use of aluminium in the construction of an airscrew. Originally, a rotating airfoil behind the aircraft, which pushes it, was called a propeller, while one which pulled from the front was a tractor. Later the term 'pusher' became adopted for the rear-mounted device in contrast to the tractor configuration and both became referred to as 'propellers' or 'airscrews'. The understanding of low speed propeller aerodynamics was fairly complete by the 1920s, but later requirements to handle more power in a smaller diameter have made the problem more complex.

Propeller research for National Advisory Committee for Aeronautics (NACA) was directed by William F. Durand from 1916. Parameters measured included propeller efficiency, thrust developed, and power absorbed. While a propeller may be tested in a wind tunnel, its performance in free-flight might differ. At the Langley Memorial Aeronautical Laboratory, E. P. Leslie used Vought VE-7s with Wright E-4 engines for data on free-flight, while Durand used reduced size, with similar shape, for wind tunnel data. Their results were published in 1926 as NACA report #220.

Theory and design

Lowry quotes a propeller efficiency of about 73.5% at cruise for a Cessna 172. This is derived from his "Bootstrap approach" for analyzing the performance of light general aviation aircraft using fixed pitch or constant speed propellers. The efficiency of the propeller is influenced by the angle of attack (α). This is defined as  α = Φ - θ, where θ is the helix angle (the angle between the resultant relative velocity and the blade rotation direction) and Φ is the blade pitch angle. Very small pitch and helix angles give a good performance against resistance but provide little thrust, while larger angles have the opposite effect. The best helix angle is when the blade is acting as a wing producing much more lift than drag. However, 'lift-and-drag' is only one way to express the aerodynamic force on the blades. To explain aircraft and engine performance the same force is expressed slightly differently in terms of thrust and torque since the required output of the propeller is thrust. Thrust and torque are the basis of the definition for the efficiency of the propeller as shown below. The advance ratio of a propeller is similar to the angle of attack of a wing.

A propeller's efficiency is determined by 

Propellers are similar in aerofoil section to a low-drag wing and as such are poor in operation when at other than their optimum angle of attack. Therefore, most propellers use a variable pitch mechanism to alter the blades' pitch angle as engine speed and aircraft velocity are changed.

A further consideration is the number and the shape of the blades used. Increasing the aspect ratio of the blades reduces drag but the amount of thrust produced depends on blade area, so using high-aspect blades can result in an excessive propeller diameter. A further balance is that using a smaller number of blades reduces interference effects between the blades, but to have sufficient blade area to transmit the available power within a set diameter means a compromise is needed. Increasing the number of blades also decreases the amount of work each blade is required to perform, limiting the local Mach number – a significant performance limit on propellers.
The performance of a propeller suffers when transonic flow first appears on the tips of the blades. As the relative air speed at any section of a propeller is a vector sum of the aircraft speed and the tangential speed due to rotation, the flow over the blade tip will reach transonic speed well before the aircraft does. When the airflow over the tip of the blade reaches its critical speed, drag and torque resistance increase rapidly and shock waves form creating a sharp increase in noise. Aircraft with conventional propellers, therefore, do not usually fly faster than Mach 0.6. There have been propeller aircraft which attained up to the Mach 0.8 range, but the low propeller efficiency at this speed makes such applications rare.

Blade twist

The tip of a propeller blade travels faster than the hub. Therefore, it is necessary for the blade to be twisted so as to decrease the angle of attack of the blade gradually from the hub to the tip.

High speed

There have been efforts to develop propellers and propfans for aircraft at high subsonic speeds. The 'fix' is similar to that of transonic wing design. Thin blade sections are used and the blades are swept back in a scimitar shape (scimitar propeller) in a manner similar to wing sweepback, so as to delay the onset of shockwaves as the blade tips approach the speed of sound. The maximum relative velocity is kept as low as possible by careful control of pitch to allow the blades to have large helix angles. A large number of blades are used to reduce work per blade and so circulation strength. Contra-rotating propellers are used. The propellers designed are more efficient than turbo-fans and their cruising speed (Mach 0.7–0.85) is suitable for airliners, but the noise generated is tremendous (see the Antonov An-70 and Tupolev Tu-95 for examples of such a design).

Physics
Forces acting on the blades of an aircraft propeller include the following. Some of these forces can be arranged to counteract each other, reducing the overall mechanical stresses imposed.
Thrust bending
Thrust loads on the blades, in reaction to the force pushing the air backwards, act to bend the blades forward. Blades are therefore often raked forwards, such that the outward centrifugal force of rotation acts to bend them backwards, thus balancing out the bending effects.
Centrifugal and aerodynamic twisting
A centrifugal twisting force is experienced by any asymmetrical spinning object. In the propeller it acts to twist the blades to a fine pitch. The aerodynamic centre of pressure is therefore usually arranged to be slightly forward of its mechanical centreline, creating a twisting moment towards coarse pitch and counteracting the centrifugal moment. However in a high-speed dive the aerodynamic force can change significantly and the moments can become unbalanced.
Centrifugal
The force felt by the blades acting to pull them away from the hub when turning. It can be arranged to help counteract the thrust bending force, as described above.
Torque bending
Air resistance acting against the blades, combined with inertial effects causes propeller blades to bend away from the direction of rotation.
Vibratory
Many types of disturbance set up vibratory forces in blades. These include aerodynamic excitation as the blades pass close to the wing and fuselage. Piston engines introduce torque impulses which may excite vibratory modes of the blades and cause fatigue failures. Torque impulses are not present when driven by a gas turbine engine.

Variable pitch

The purpose of varying pitch angle is to maintain an optimal angle of attack for the propeller blades, giving maximum efficiency throughout the flight regime. This reduces fuel usage. Only by maximising propeller efficiency at high speeds can the highest possible speed be achieved. Effective angle of attack decreases as airspeed increases, so a coarser pitch is required at high airspeeds.

The requirement for pitch variation is shown by the propeller performance during the Schneider Trophy competition in 1931. The very wide speed range was achieved because some of the usual requirements for aircraft performance did not apply. There was no compromise on top-speed efficiency, the take-off distance was not restricted to available runway length and there was no climb requirement.

The variable pitch blades used on the Tupolev Tu-95 propel it at a speed exceeding the maximum once considered possible for a propeller-driven aircraft using an exceptionally coarse pitch.

Mechanisms

Early pitch control settings were pilot operated, either with a small number of preset positions or continuously variable.

The simplest mechanism is the ground-adjustable propeller, which may be adjusted on the ground, but is effectively a fixed-pitch prop once airborne. The spring-loaded "two-speed" VP prop is set to fine for takeoff, and then triggered to coarse once in cruise, the propeller remaining coarse for the remainder of the flight.

After World War I, automatic propellers were developed to maintain an optimum angle of attack. This was done by balancing the centripetal twisting moment on the blades and a set of counterweights against a spring and the aerodynamic forces on the blade. Automatic props had the advantage of being simple, lightweight, and requiring no external control, but a particular propeller's performance was difficult to match with that of the aircraft's power plant.

The most common variable pitch propeller is the constant-speed propeller. This is controlled by a hydraulic constant speed unit (CSU). It automatically adjusts the blade pitch in order to maintain a constant engine speed for any given power control setting. Constant-speed propellers allow the pilot to set a rotational speed according to the need for maximum engine power or maximum efficiency, and a propeller governor acts as a closed-loop controller to vary propeller pitch angle as required to maintain the selected engine speed. In most aircraft this system is hydraulic, with engine oil serving as the hydraulic fluid. However, electrically controlled propellers were developed during World War II and saw extensive use on military aircraft, and have recently seen a revival in use on home-built aircraft.

Another design is the V-Prop, which is self-powering and self-governing.

 Feathering 

On most variable-pitch propellers, the blades can be rotated parallel to the airflow to stop rotation of the propeller and reduce drag when the engine fails or is deliberately shut down. This is called feathering, a term borrowed from rowing. On single-engined aircraft, whether a powered glider or turbine-powered aircraft, the effect is to increase the gliding distance. On a multi-engine aircraft, feathering the propeller on an inoperative engine reduces drag, and helps the aircraft maintain speed and altitude with the operative engines.

Most feathering systems for reciprocating engines sense a drop in oil pressure and move the blades toward the feather position, and require the pilot to pull the propeller control back to disengage the high-pitch stop pins before the engine reaches idle RPM. Turboprop control systems usually utilize a negative torque sensor'' in the reduction gearbox which moves the blades toward feather when the engine is no longer providing power to the propeller. Depending on design, the pilot may have to push a button to override the high-pitch stops and complete the feathering process, or the feathering process may be totally automatic.

Reverse pitch

The propellers on some aircraft can operate with a negative blade pitch angle, and thus reverse the thrust from the propeller. This is known as Beta Pitch. Reverse thrust is used to help slow the aircraft after landing and is particularly advantageous when landing on a wet runway as wheel braking suffers reduced effectiveness. In some cases reverse pitch allows the aircraft to taxi in reverse  – this is particularly useful for getting floatplanes out of confined docks.

Counter-rotation

Counter-rotating propellers are sometimes used on twin-engine and multi-engine aircraft with wing-mounted engines. These propellers turn in opposite directions from their counterpart on the other wing to balance out the torque and p-factor effects. They are sometimes referred to as "handed" propellers since there are left hand and right hand versions of each prop.

Generally, the propellers on both engines of most conventional twin-engined aircraft spin clockwise (as viewed from the rear of the aircraft). To eliminate the critical engine problem, counter-rotating propellers usually turn "inwards" towards the fuselage – clockwise on the left engine and counterclockwise on the right – however, there are exceptions (especially during World War II) such as the P-38 Lightning which turned "outwards" (counterclockwise on the left engine and clockwise on the right) away from the fuselage from the WW II years, and the Airbus A400 whose inboard and outboard engines turn in opposite directions even on the same wing.

Contra-rotation

A contra-rotating propeller or contra-prop places two counter-rotating propellers on concentric drive shafts so that one sits immediately 'downstream' of the other propeller. This provides the benefits of counter-rotating propellers for a single powerplant. The forward propeller provides the majority of the thrust, while the rear propeller also recovers energy lost in the swirling motion of the air in the propeller slipstream. Contra-rotation also increases the ability of a propeller to absorb power from a given engine, without increasing propeller diameter. However the added cost, complexity, weight and noise of the system rarely make it worthwhile and it is only used on high-performance types where ultimate performance is more important than efficiency.

Aircraft fans

A fan is a propeller with a large number of blades. A fan therefore produces a lot of thrust for a given diameter but the closeness of the blades means that each strongly affects the flow around the others. If the flow is supersonic, this interference can be beneficial if the flow can be compressed through a series of shock waves rather than one. By placing the fan within a shaped duct, specific flow patterns can be created depending on flight speed and engine performance. As air enters the duct, its speed is reduced while its pressure and temperature increase. If the aircraft is at a high subsonic speed this creates two advantages: the air enters the fan at a lower Mach speed; and the higher temperature increases the local speed of sound. While there is a loss in efficiency as the fan is drawing on a smaller area of the free stream and so using less air, this is balanced by the ducted fan retaining efficiency at higher speeds where conventional propeller efficiency would be poor. A ducted fan or propeller also has certain benefits at lower speeds but the duct needs to be shaped in a different manner than one for higher speed flight. More air is taken in and the fan therefore operates at an efficiency equivalent to a larger un-ducted propeller. Noise is also reduced by the ducting and should a blade become detached the duct would help contain the damage. However the duct adds weight, cost, complexity and (to a certain degree) drag.

See also
Advance ratio
Axial fan design
Helicopter rotor
List of aircraft propeller manufacturers
Momentum theory
Charles M. Olmsted, early American "high efficiency" propeller designer (1909)
Turboprop
Radial-lift rotors

References

External links

Experimental Aircraft Propellers
 Smithsonian National Air and Space Museum's How Things Fly website

Aircraft propulsion components
Aeronautics